Telok Blangah Hill Park is a park situated at Telok Blangah Green, off Henderson Road, in Bukit Merah. It connects Mount Faber Park via Henderson Waves Bridge (274m, 899ft). Standing at 36m (118ft) above Henderson Road, it is the tallest pedestrian bridge in Singapore. Henderson Waves is renowned for its artistic, distinctive wave-like structure consisting of a series of undulating curved 'ribs'.

Telok Blangah Hill Park is also part of the Southern Ridges, which also comprises Mount Faber Park, HortPark, Kent Ridge Park and Labrador Nature Reserve.

See also
List of parks in Singapore
Southern Ridges
Murder of Huang Na

References

External links

National Parks Board, Singapore

Parks in Singapore
Hills of Singapore